Levan Sanadze (August 16, 1928 – August 24, 1998) was a Georgian athlete, born in Tiflis, who competed mainly in the 100 metres.

He competed for the USSR in the 1952 Summer Olympics held in Helsinki, Finland in the 4 x 100 metre relay where he won the silver medal with his team mates Boris Tokarev, Levan Kalyayev and Vladimir Sukharev.

Competition record

1928 births
Sportspeople from Tbilisi
Male sprinters from Georgia (country)
Soviet male sprinters
Olympic silver medalists for the Soviet Union
Athletes (track and field) at the 1952 Summer Olympics
Olympic athletes of the Soviet Union
1998 deaths
European Athletics Championships medalists
Medalists at the 1952 Summer Olympics
Olympic silver medalists in athletics (track and field)